Sisinis (Greek: Σισίνης) is a surname. Notable people with the surname include:

Chrysanthos Sisinis. (died 1845), a Greek revolutionary leader and a politician
Chrysanthos Sisinis (born 1857), Greek general
Georgios Sisinis (1769-1831), Greek revolutionary leader and farmer

Greek-language surnames